James "Jakes" H. Mulholland (1 October 1902 – 19 August 1969) was a former U.S. soccer defender who earned two cap with the U.S. national team in 1924.  Mulholland was a member of the U.S. soccer team at the 1924 Summer Olympics.  While he was a member of the U.S. team at the Olympics, Mulholland did not play in the two U.S. games.  However, following the tournament, the U.S. had two exhibition games.  Mulholland played in both, a win over Poland and a loss to Ireland.  In 1928, he played one game with Bethlehem Steel F.C. of the American Soccer League and an unknown number with Bethlehem in the Eastern Professional Soccer League.

References

1902 births
1969 deaths
United States men's international soccer players
Olympic soccer players of the United States
Footballers at the 1924 Summer Olympics
American Soccer League (1921–1933) players
Eastern Professional Soccer League (1928–29) players
Bethlehem Steel F.C. (1907–1930) players
Association football defenders
American soccer players